Acleris helvolaris is a species of moth of the family Tortricidae. It is found in China (Fujian).

References

Moths described in 1987
helvolaris
Moths of Asia